John Frederick Huntley (18 July 1921 – 7 August 2003) was an English film historian, educator and archivist.

Huntley was born in Kew, London and entered the film industry as a teaboy at Denham Studios around 1938. After war service in the RAF, where he had a sideline in using film shows as an educational tool, he re-entered the film industry as an assistant to film score conductor Muir Mathieson; Huntley had briefly studied at the Royal College of Music just after the war began.

He joined the British Film Institute in 1952, initially working for the information department, but from 1955 in distribution. His connection with the Telekinema during the Festival of Britain led to him being appointed as a programmer at the new National Film Theatre for a time. According to film collector Kevin Brownlow, Huntley was the most accessible of the BFI's staff because of his skill at bending the rules; he left the institute in 1974. With one of his two daughters, Amanda, he set up Huntley Film Archives in 1984, based from 2005 in the Herefordshire village of Ewyas Harold.

John Huntley was a published author and regular broadcaster; he presented the Anglia Television series Bygones for two years from 1987, and a later similar series, Attic Archives, for BBC Scotland. He worked for Video 125 for a short period. He died from cancer in London.

References

External links
 
 Huntley Film Archives

1921 births
2003 deaths
English film critics
British film historians
People from Kew, London
British Film Institute
20th-century British non-fiction writers
Royal Air Force personnel of World War II